Robert Edward Laraba (May 30, 1933February 16, 1962) was an American professional football player who was a linebacker and quarterback in the American Football League (AFL). He played professionally for the Los Angeles/San Diego Chargers (1960–1961) after playing college football with the UTEP Miners. He was killed in an automobile accident at the conclusion of his second season with the Chargers.

See also
Other American Football League players

References

 

1933 births
1962 deaths
People from Franklin County, Vermont
Players of American football from Vermont
American football linebackers
American football quarterbacks
UTEP Miners football players
Los Angeles Chargers players
San Diego Chargers players
American Football League players
Road incident deaths in California